Sadik Kadir and Purav Raja were the defending champions, but they lost to Murad Inoyatov and Andrey Kumantsov in the first round.Gong Maoxin and Li Zhe won the title, by defeating Divij Sharan and Vishnu Vardhan 6–3, 6–1 in the final.

Seeds

Draw

Draw

References
 Doubles Draw

Karshi Challenger - Doubles
Karshi Challenger